Marcelo Pablo Barticciotto Cicaré (born 1 January 1967) is an Argentine-Chilean former footballer and manager.

Club career
In 1987, Barticciotto made his professional debut with Huracán of the National B Division in Argentina.

Barticciotto arrived to Chilean club Colo-Colo in 1988, where he would become an idol to supporters.  Barticciotto won seven national championships and three international championships in twelve years with the club.  The most important of those championships was the Copa Libertadores 1991, where he scored three goals.  Colo-Colo is the only Chilean team to ever win the Copa Libertadores.

After these accomplishments, Barticciotto signed for Club América in Mexico.  However, he did not experience the same form he had in Chile and in 1995 returned to Chile to sign for Colo-Colo's rival Universidad Católica.  His time here was even shorter.  In a game against his old team, Colo-Colo, Barticciotto scored the lone goal of the match which eliminated Colo-Colo from the Copa Libertadores tournament of the same year.  Before the game, Barticciotto had stated in an interview that he did not want to score a goal against  his former team but wanted to play a very good game. Therefore, when he scored the goal he did not celebrate it.  Afterwards he reiterated that he wished he did not score the goal. Of course there was backlash  from these comments and his actions and this ultimately led to his dismissal from the team.

In 1996, Barticciotto made his return to Colo-Colo.  He regained his form and was an important part of the reason that Colo-Colo would win three straight championships from 1996-1998.  In his final season, 2002, Colo-Colo would go on to win his seventh championship but was not a fixture in the starting line-up for most of the season.

On January 12, 2003 he retired in front of more than fifty thousands spectators in Colo-Colo's stadium, Estadio Monumental David Arellano.  He retired having won the second most championships by a Colo-Colo player, behind only Luis Mena who has nine.

Managerial career
Barticciotto was hired to manage U. de Concepción in 2007.  Barticciotto inherited a team that was on the verge of relegation and took them to the final of the 2007 Clausura tournament against his former club Colo-Colo.

During the 2008 Clausura and with the resignation of Colo-Colo manager Fernando Astengo as the team was tied for first place in the table, Barticciotto was signed on to direct the team. In the first game with Baricciotto as coach Colo-Colo went on to defeat Santiago Morning 2-1 with 2 goals from Lucas Barrios with one being done by bicycle kick. Colo-Colo went on to lose the two following games which in turn earned Barticiotto criticism from both the press and fans alike. The turning point was a 2-0 victory against rivals Universidad de Chile. Barticiotto and Colo-Colo went on to the play-offs and obtain the 2008 Clausura championship and qualify for the Copa Libertadores 2009. On 17 April 2009 the Coach Barticciotto has quit Colo Colo, the new coach is Gualberto Jara.

Personal life
He is the father of Bruno Barticciotto, a Chilean professional footballer who began his career playing for Universidad Católica.

Honours

Club

As player
Colo-Colo
 Primera División de Chile (7): 1989, 1990, 1991, 1996, 1998, 1997 Clausura, 2002 Clausura
 Copa Chile (2): 1989, 1989
 Copa Libertadores (1): 1991
 Recopa Sudamericana (1): 1992
 Copa Interamericana (1): 1992

As manager
Colo-Colo
 Primera División de Chile: 2008 Clausura

References

1967 births
Living people
Sportspeople from Avellaneda
Argentine emigrants to Chile
Argentine expatriate footballers
Argentine footballers
Chilean footballers
Chilean football managers
Association football forwards
Club Atlético Huracán footballers
Colo-Colo footballers
Club América footballers
Universidad de Concepción managers
Colo-Colo managers
Audax Italiano managers
Liga MX players
Chilean Primera División players
Primera Nacional players
Expatriate footballers in Mexico
Argentine expatriate sportspeople in Chile
Expatriate footballers in Chile
Naturalized citizens of Chile
Expatriate football managers in Chile
Argentine expatriate sportspeople in Mexico